Khusbhu is a volume of poetry written by Pakistani poet and columnist Parveen Shakir, and published in  1976.

Poetry
The poetry in Khushbu, like most of Shakir's subsequent work, can be divided into two categories: the ghazal [plural: ghazalyaat], and free verse.

Ghazal

Style
Most of Shakir's ghazalyaat contain five to ten couplets, often - though not always - inter-related. Sometimes, two consecutive couplets may differ greatly in meaning and context [For example, in one of her works, the couplet 'That girl, like her home, perhaps/ Fell victim to the flood' is immediately followed by 'I see light when I think of you/ Perhaps remembrance has become the moon'].

The ghazalyaat in Khusbhu heavily rely on metaphors and similes, which are repeatedly and thought-provokingly used to bring force, thoughtfulness and lyricism in her work. An example is the couplet, "Wo tou khushbu hai, hawaon main bikhar jaye ga/ Masla phool ka hai, phool kidher jayega?" [Translation: He is fragrance, he will scatter in the air/ the trouble lies with the flower - where shall the flower go?] where Shakir relates 'fragrance' to an unfaithful lover, 'air' to the unfaithful's secret loves, and 'flower' to the person cheated. Other metaphors Shakir commonly used in the book are mausum [weather] for times, ghulab [rose] for the female lover, titli [butterfly] for a Romeo, hava [wind] for a wayward love, darya [river] for affection, baarish [rain] for affection, and aandhi [storm] for difficulties.

Themes
The ghazalyaat in Khusbu mainly deal with the feminine perspective on love and romance, and associated themes such as beauty, intimacy, separation, break-ups, distances, distrust and infidelity and disloyalty.

Shakir in her ghazal
The ghazalyaat in Shakir's books are one of the biggest, undisputed sources to her personality, and those in Khushbu establish her as an emotional, romantic, fiery and, above all, strong woman. In one couplet, Shakir's describes her fiery nature, and determination to acquire what she loves, thus:

"My heart is fiery, and to reach thee/
It shall render my body a canoe, and my blood a river."

She also expresses her stead-fastness in love ["Is there anyone like me, who/ will dedicate their life to thy remembrance?" and "Where have I not gone in search of peace of heart/ But this heart - Forever it has been in his company!"], her determination to learn from bitter experience, and to move on in life [I moved on, for thy infidelity/ Revealed to me this distrustful world], and the fact that she does not wear her emotions on her sleeve [It has shattered, but greets with smile/ I am in control of my attitude]. The ghazalyaat in Khushbu bring forth Shakir's thirst for trying new things [I must leave the road/ The path to my house is not paved], her staunch preference of truth over lies ["Your truths were bitter, but I like them" and "I will speak the truth at all costs, I was not aware/ You did not know of this evil of mine!] and her habit to experience every emotion intensely [I have been well-known to the nature of storms].

Separation
Separation is a much-emphasized topic in Khushbu, and is dealt with in many ways. It may be willing or unwilling separation - in the form of break-ups, long distance relationships, dying love or memories of an old romance - and is emphasized in works such as Neend tou khwaab hai aur hijr ki shub khwaab kahan? [Sleep is a dream - and the night of separation is not a dream!], Dost [Friend], Shadeed dukh tha agarcha teri judaai ka [Though the pain of your separation was great!] and Chiraagh-e-raah bujha kya, kay rehnuma bhi gaya [The guide left as soon as the lamp died out].

Shakir's work Let Him Come to Sprout a Flower in my Heart heavily focuses on these themes. A few couplets are cited here:
"Let him come to sprout a flower in my heart,
Let him come to wound my heart anew!

Let fragrance awaken in my empty doors,
Let him come to decorate my house.

Around here, live many people he knows,
Can not he come under pretense of meeting someone else?"

In The Night Dances Like my Body, Shakir says:
"I will live my life, away from you,
Like an exile."

Similarly, separation that is unwilling on both sides is implied by the following couplets in her ghazal My face - his eyes!
"Often, I wake up from my sleep, thinking,
How does he bear the night [sans me]?

Despite all these distances, his arms,
[Seem to] encircle me, forever."

Some other couplets of Shakir, focusing on the theme of separation:
"He walks with me, like the moon,
Who says I am alone in nights of separation?"

"Meeting - promise to meet again - separation,
So much happened so suddenly!"

"I am living after [separating from] you,
And you - you, too, are living your life."

Other
The subject of the wayward love is brought up time and again in ghazalyaat such as Wo tou khushbu hai, (He is fragrance) Khushbu bhi us k tarz-e-pazeerai per gai (Fragrance's treatment is like his welcome), Gongay laboun pe hurf-e-tamanna kiya mujhe (I am a wish of nonspeaking lips).

Shakir's poetry often speaks of pain, its pain and its joy. It also often mentions loss and loneliness, grief, shattered dreams, life after a break-up and the healing power of love.

The Revolutionary Aspect
Shakir made extensive use of the Urdu first-person, feminine pronoun in her verses which, though extremely common in prose, was rarely used in poetry, even by female poets, until Shakir did so. This was a revolutionary step for Urdu poetry, and can be seen as part of the feminist movement in Urdu literature.

Also, through Khushbu, Shakir introduced the word larki in her poetry, the Urdu substitute for the word 'girl,' and one not often seen in Urdu poetry before her time. She also extensively used larkiyaan, its plural. The usage of the two words can be seen in the following couplets from the book:

"That girl, like her home, perhaps,
Fell victim to the flood."

"Girls were sitting, feet dipped inside,
Light seemed to spread within the pond."

"People - They passed through the lanes - none hesitated - paused - returned -
Left behind were the girls - staring, through half-open windows, since eve!" 

"All the girls are getting to know each other,
Thus spreads the relation of the ideology of Shahnaz."

The words Larki and Larkiyaan are also mentioned in her poems, Larkiyaan Udaas Hain (The Girls are Sad), Khwaab (Dream) and Sirf Ek Larki (Only a Girl), among others.

See also
 Parveen Shakir
 Fehmida Riaz
 Kishwar Naheed

References

1976 poetry books
Pakistani poetry collections